Grzegorz Seweryn Kaliciak (born 23 March 1973) is a Colonel of Polish Armed Forces.

Life 
Grzegorz Kaliciak was born in Prudnik as a son of Franciszek Kaliciak and his wife Władysława, worker of ZPB "Frotex". He was raised by his mother and his grandmother. He attended Zespół Szkół Rolniczych in Prudnik and Tadeusz Kościuszko Land Forces Military Academy in Wrocław.

He started his military service in 4 Battalion Rozpoznawczy in Wędrzyn. He was promoted to the rank of captain in 1999. During the invasion of Iraq he served in PKW Irak. He was a commander of Polish forces during the defense of City Hall in Karbala. He also served in Task Force White Eagle in Afghanistan.

He's an author of a book "Karbala. Raport z obrony City Hall", which was published in 2015. The character Kalicki from the film Karbala is based on him.

Awards 
 Order of the Military Cross (2009)
 Military Cross (2015)
 Cross of Merit for Bravery
 Iraq Star
 Afghanistan Star
 Medal of the Armed Forces in the Service of the Fatherland
 Bronze Medal of Merit for National Defence
 Medal of the Centenary of Regained Independence (2019)
 Odznaka Skoczka Spadochronowego Wojsk Powietrznodesantowych
 Wojskowa Odznaka Sprawności Fizycznej
 Odznaka Honorowa Wojsk Lądowych
 Złota odznaka tytułu honorowego "Zasłużony Żołnierz RP" I stopnia (2017)
 Odznaka pamiątkowa 17 WBZ
 Medal Pamiątkowy Wielonarodowej Dywizji Centrum-Południe w Iraku
 Nagroda "Buzdygan" – Żołnierz Roku 2009
 NATO Medal

References 

Polish Army officers
1973 births
People from Prudnik
Living people